Taos Downtown Historic District is a historic district in Taos, New Mexico. Taos "played a major role in the development of New Mexico, under Spanish, Mexican, and American governments." It a key historical feature of the Enchanted Circle Scenic Byway of northern New Mexico.

Geography
Taos Downtown Historic District is located in the center of Taos, New Mexico. It is roughly bounded by Ojitos, Quesnel, Martyr's Lane, Las Placitas and Ranchitos Streets.

In the distance is Taos Peak.

History

Native Americans
Arrowheads, potshards and pictographs found in the area provide evidence that Native Americans ranged through the Taos area about 6,000 years ago. About 900 years ago Pueblo people moved into the Taos and Picuris Pueblo areas.

Spanish settlement
Spanish conquistadors, led by Hernando de Alvardo, entered the Taos Valley in 1540. The area was settled by Spanish colonialists starting about 1615. What had begun as good relationships between the people from the pueblo and the settlers became contentious due to "brutal treatment" of the pueblo residents by the Franciscan missionaries, pressure to convert to Christianity, and demands to make tributes to encomenderos. Some of the colonists left the Taos area in 1840 after the Franciscan priest was killed. In 1661 some people returned to the still difficult situation. Due to the poor treatment of the residents of the pueblo, a revolt by indigenous peoples in 1680 resulted in the Spanish being driven out of the area. Sixteen years later the Taos valley was resettled by Don Diego de Vargas of Spain with a renewed and more respectful perspective. Spanish families settled in the Taos Plaza area and Ranchos de Taos. In 1710 the Spanish regained the territory.

For protection against attacks by Plains Indians, many people of Spanish heritage lived on, or built houses very near, the Taos Pueblo. Subsequently, concerned about the rate of intermarriage between the Spanish and people of the pueblo, the Spanish were asked to move at least "one league" away from the pueblo.

In 1779 the Battle of Cuerno Verde was led by Juan Bautista de Anza against the Comanches. Several tribal leaders and the chief were killed during the battle. As a result, the hostilities by that tribe subsided. In 1794 an order was initiated that prohibited Spanish, Negroes and mulattoes from living on pueblo lands. In addition, the General Indian Policy by Commandant General Teodoro de Croix resulted in a reduction in hostile attacks in the Taos Valley.

In 1796 The Don Fernando de Taos Land Grant gave land to 63 Spanish families in the Taos valley, including the Taos Plaza which was then called Don Fernando de Taos. The settlement was built as a fortified plaza, with strong gates to enclose the settlement to protect the residents and livestock at threats of attack by Plains Indians. At each corner of the thick adobe walls of the plaza sentries stood guard for protection. Within the plaza, residents celebrated during fiestas, engaged in church festivities, and traded goods. It is now a central plaza surrounded by residential areas.

Taos was the most northern stop on the El Camino Real de Tierra Adentro, also known as the King's Highway, from Mexico City.

Mountain men who trapped for beaver nearby made Taos their home in the early 1800s. In December 1826 Kit Carson arrived and later married Josefa Jaramillo from Taos. At that time there were about 500 settlers in Taos. It was almost as important as Santa Fe and was the northernmost custom depot of the Spanish colonial settlements. As the Santa Fe Trail was established between the American territory of Missouri and Santa Fe, fur trade and goods trade developed in Taos for people of American, Spanish and Native American heritage. Santa Fe Trail traders included Charles Bent and William Bent who operated Bent's Fort. Goods produced in Taos included furs, blankets, and "Taos lightning", made from fermented wheat.

In 1826 Padre Antonio José Martínez began to serve the parish of Our Lady of Guadalupe. He also founded a newspaper, the first one west of the Mississippi, which was the precursor to the modern The Taos News.

In 1830 building housing a jail and courthouse was built on the north side of the plaza. The Columbian and Don Fernando hotels, saloons and gambling establishments were built to accommodate the influx of visitors to Taos.

Sites
 Taos Plaza
 Our Lady of Guadalupe Parish
 La Morada de Nuestra Senora de Guadalupe
 Kit Carson House

See also
 La Loma Plaza Historic District
 Martinez Hacienda
 Ranchos de Taos
 Taos Pueblo

American territory and settlement

The United States took possession of New Mexico in 1847 (during the Mexican–American War). In retaliation, some former Mexican citizens and Taos Natives rebelled and during the Taos Revolt Charles Bent, the first territorial governor, was killed in his home. In response, the United States Army killed more than 150 people at the Taos Pueblo and destroyed the original San Geronimo Mission. In 1850, New Mexico and Arizona became an official territory of the United States.

Taos, one of the oldest Spanish settlements in the Taos valley, has examples of Spanish Colonial, Mission Revival, Pueblo Revival and Territorial architecture.

In 1930 several buildings on the plaza succumbed to fire, including the courthouse building and the Don Fernando Hotel. A new courthouse building was built and in 1933 and 1934 the Works Progress Administration funded the creation of murals within the courthouse. The frescoes were painted by Taos art colony members Emil Bisttram, Victor Higgins, Ward Lockwood and Bert Geer Phillips.

Sites
 Governor Charles Bent House
 Taos Inn

Taos art colony

In the late 19th century members of the Taos art colony settled in homes and studios around the plaza. The first of which were Bert Geer Phillips and Ernest L. Blumenschein who became "enthralled" by Taos scenery and clear light in 1898. The Taos Society of Artists was formed in 1912 with other artists who had moved to Taos.

Socialite Mabel Dodge Luhan arrived in Taos in 1917 and brought "creative luminaries" to the area, including Carl Jung, Georgia O'Keeffe, D. H. Lawrence, Thomas Wolfe, Willa Cather, Ansel Adams, Thornton Wilder, and Aldous Huxley.

Sites
 Ernest L. Blumenschein House
 Eanger Irving Couse House and Studio—Joseph Henry Sharp Studios
 Nicolai Fechin House
 Leon Gaspard House
 Harwood House
 Ernest Martin Hennings
 Mabel Dodge Luhan House
 Taos Art Museum

Hippie hang out
Inspired by the movie Easy Rider in which bikers "briefly discovered peace, creativity, and free love", Hippies arrived in Taos in the 1960s and 1970s and their residence influenced the culture of Taos.

Taos historic places

Gallery

See also

 National Register of Historic Places listings in Taos County, New Mexico

Notes

Citations

References

External links

 Map of Taos Downtown Historic District
 Historic Taos, Self-guided walking tour

Buildings and structures in Taos, New Mexico
Geography of Taos County, New Mexico
Historic districts on the National Register of Historic Places in New Mexico
Northern Rio Grande National Heritage Area
Tourist attractions in Taos, New Mexico
National Register of Historic Places in Taos County, New Mexico